Banupur is a census town in Sankrail CD Block of Howrah Sadar subdivision in Howrah district in the Indian state of West Bengal. It is a part of Kolkata Urban Agglomeration.

Demographics
As per 2011 Census of India Banupur had a total population of 9,626 of which 5,210 (54%) were males and 4,416 (46%) were females. Population below 6 years was 1,251. The total number of literates in Banupur was 6,401 (76.43% of the population over 6 years).

Banupur was part of Kolkata Urban Agglomeration in 2011 census.
      
 India census, Banupur had a population of 11,645. Males constitute 63% of the population and females 37%. Banupur has an average literacy rate of 66%, higher than the national average of 59.5%; with 69% of the males and 31% of females literate. 9% of the population is under 6 years of age.

Personality
The family of the renowned artist Nandalal Bose belonged to Banupur. He used to visit Banupur regularly.

Transport
Satyen Bose Road (Sankrail Station Road) is the artery of the town.

Bus

Private Bus
 69 Sankrail railway station - Howrah Station

Mini Bus
 24 Sankrail railway station - Howrah Station

Bus Routes Without Numbers
 Sankrail railway station - New Town Shapoorji Housing Estate
 Sarenga (Kolatala More) - New Town Unitech

Train
Sankrail railway station on Howrah-Kharagpur line is the nearest railway station.

References

Cities and towns in Howrah district
Neighbourhoods in Kolkata
Kolkata Metropolitan Area